Playa Verde is a resort (balneario) in the Maldonado Department of southeastern Uruguay.

Geography
It borders the resort Las Flores to the northwest, separated by the stream Arroyo Tarariras, and the resort Playa Hermosa to the southeast.

Population
In 2011, Playa Verde had a population of 269 permanent inhabitants and 709 dwellings.
 
Source: Instituto Nacional de Estadística de Uruguay

References

External links
INE map of Las Flores, Playa Verde, Playa Hermosa and Playa Grande

Populated places in the Maldonado Department
Beaches of Uruguay
Seaside resorts in Uruguay